The 2018 Breeders' Cup World Championships was the 35th edition of the premier event of the North American thoroughbred horse racing year. The 14 races, all but one of which were Grade I, took place on November 2 and 3 at Churchill Downs in Louisville, Kentucky. The races were telecast by NBCSN on Friday and early Saturday, and by NBC later on Saturday. The Breeders' Cup is generally regarded as the end of the North American racing season, although a few Grade I events take place in later November and December. The event typically determines champions in many of the Eclipse Award divisions, although it was missing the eventual Horse of the Year, Triple Crown champion Justify, who was retired in July.

Qualifying

A maximum of 14 horses (12 in the Turf Sprint and Juvenile Turf Sprint) are allowed to start in each race. Horses can automatically qualify by winning one of the designated races in the Breeders' Cup Challenge series, which provide "Win and You're In" berths in a specified division of the Breeders' Cup. Other pre-entries are ranked by a points system and the judgement of a panel of experts.

A record 221 pre-entries were taken on October 24. Twelve races, including the Classic, were over-subscribed, meaning more than 14 horses (12 in the Juvenile Turf Sprint) wished to enter. Forty-eight of the pre-entries were automatic qualifiers through the Challenge series.

Five winners of Challenge series races went on to win their respective division at the Breeders' Cup:
 Accelerate, who won the Classic, automatically qualified by winning both the Pacific Classic and Awesome Again Stakes
 Game Winner won the Juvenile after automatically qualifying by winning the American Pharoah Stakes
 Sistercharlie won the Filly & Mare Turf after automatically qualifying in the Beverly D. Stakes
 Roy H won the Santa Anita Sprint Championship and the Sprint
 Jaywalk won both the Frizette Stakes and Juvenile Fillies

Event preparation
In April 2016, the Breeders' Cup organization announced that Churchill Downs would host the event for the ninth time in 2018. As the home of the Kentucky Derby, Churchill Downs had the capacity to host the large crowds and betting handle expected at the event. Churchill Downs underwent a $70 million upgrade to its facilities to secure the bid, focused on improved dining and viewing spaces.

One of the major changes for 2018 was that the Friday card, dubbed "Future Stars Friday", featured five juvenile races (those restricted to two-year-old horses). This included a new race, the Breeders' Cup Juvenile Turf Sprint, which was the only race in the series that was not a Grade I event as it was not yet eligible for graded status. The Distaff, which had previously highlighted the Friday card, was held on Saturday.

Results

Friday, November 2

The attendance on Friday was 42,249, up 29% from the previous year at Del Mar and up 4% over the last time the Breeders' Cup was held at Churchill Downs, in 2011. The total amount wagered on the 10 race card was $52,216,685, similar to the amount wagered in 2017.

Game Winner was the easy winner of the Breeders' Cup Juvenile and established himself as the almost certain Champion two-year-old male horse and early favorite for the 2019 Kentucky Derby. The balloting for Champion two-year-old filly will likely be close between Newspaperofrecord, winner of the Juvenile Fillies Turf, and Jaywalk, winner of the Juvenile Fillies. Dirt runners normally are given an edge in North America, but Newspaperofrecord's win on the turf was considered one of the outstanding performances of the event.

Source: Equibase Charts

The races were televised on NBCSN.

Saturday, November 3

The Saturday card was watched by a crowd of 70,423, a major increase from the previous year's attendance at Del Mar, which had been capped at 37,500. However, the total amount bet on the nine Breeders' Cup races held on Saturday was down 4% from 2017. The weather was cool with the turf course officially listed as good, verging on yielding. The main track was officially listed as fast.

The highlights were Accelerate's victory in the Classic and Enable's win in the Turf. Enable became the first horse to win the Prix de l'Arc de Triomphe and Breeders' Cup Turf in the same year. Her owner-breeder Juddmonte Farms, trainer John Gosden and jockey Frankie Dettori also won the Mile with Expert Eye.

Peter Miller became the first person to train back-to-back winners of two races after Stormy Liberal and Roy H won the Turf Sprint and Sprint respectively. John Sadler, who saddled his first Breeders' Cup runner in 1988, earned his first win at the event with Accelerate in the Classic. Brad Cox also trained his first winner, Monomoy Girl in the Distaff.

Irad Ortiz Jr. won the Shoemaker Award for outstanding jockey at the event after he won two races, the Juvenile Fillies Turf with Newspaperofrecord and the Filly & Mare Sprint with Shamrock Rose, plus scoring five more top four finishes. Florent Geroux finished second in the standings after riding three winners over the weekend: Jaywalk in the Juvenile Fillies, Game Winner in the Juvenile and Accelerate in the Classic. Paco Lopez earned his first Breeders' Cup win aboard Roy H in the Sprint.

With his win in the Classic, Accelerate cemented his chances to win the Eclipse Award for Champion Older Male Dirt Horse, and moved into consideration for American Horse of the Year. Similarly, Monomoy Girl "stands out" in the three-year-old filly division after winning the Distaff and Roy H locked up his second win in the Sprint division. The female turf horse division will likely be between Enable, who became the first horse to win the Prix de l'Arc de Triomphe and Breeders' Cup Turf in the same year, and Sistercharlie, with four Group I wins in North America including the Filly & Mare Turf.

Source: Equibase Charts

The early races were televised by NBCSN. The main NBC network broadcast the Mile, Distaff, Turf and Classic.

References

Breeders' Cup
Breeders' Cup
Churchill Downs
Breeders' Cup
Breeders' Cup